The 14th edition of the Men's FINA Water Polo World Cup was held in Oradea, Romania from July 27 to August 1, 2010.

Format
8 teams qualified for the 2010 FINA World Cup. They were split into two groups of 4 teams. After playing a Round-robin every team advanced to the quarterfinals. The best ranked team of Group A played against the fourth ranked team of Group B, the second ranked team of Group A against the third ranked team of Group B the third ranked team of Group A against the second ranked team of Group B and the fourth ranked team of Group A against the best ranked team of Group B. The winners of those quarterfinals advanced to the Semis and played out the champion while the losers of the quarterfinals competed in placement matches.

Groups

Preliminary round
All times are EEST (UTC+3)

Group A

Group B

Knockout round

Championship

Quarterfinals
All times are EEST (UTC+3)

Semifinals
All times are EEST (UTC+3)

Bronze medal match
All times are EEST (UTC+3)

Final
All times are EEST (UTC+3)

5th–8th playoffs

5th–8th semifinals
All times are EEST (UTC+3)

7th place playoff
All times are EEST (UTC+3)

5th place playoff
All times are EEST (UTC+3)

Final standings

  Serbia, Croatia, Spain, United States and Romania qualified for the 2011 World Aquatics Championships.

Individual awards
Best Player

Best Goalkeeper

Best Scorer
 — 17 goals

References

External links
Official site

F
W
FINA Water Polo World Cup
International water polo competitions hosted by Romania
July 2010 sports events in Romania